Jordan Barroilhet Bloomfield (born 23 January 1998) is a French professional footballer who plays as a defender.

Club career
Barroilhet started his career with French fifth tier side Montpellier B. In 2018, he signed for Peralada in the Spanish third tier. Before the 2020 season, Barroilhet signed for Chilean second-tier club Puerto Montt. In 2021, he signed for Curicó Unido in the Chilean top flight, where he made four appearances. On 4 April 2021, Barroilhet debuted for Curicó Unido in a 2–0 loss to La Serena.

International career 
He is eligible to represent Chile internationally through his father.

Personal life
Barroilhet has two relatives who are professional footballers: his older brother, Richard, who came to Chile on 2017 to join Deportes Puerto Montt and his Chilean cousin Clemente Montes Barroilhet, who began his career playing for Universidad Católica.

References

External links
 

Living people
1998 births
People from Saint-Raphaël, Var
French people of Chilean descent
Sportspeople of Chilean descent
Sportspeople from Var (department)
French footballers
Footballers from Provence-Alpes-Côte d'Azur
Association football defenders
CF Peralada players
Deportes Puerto Montt footballers
Curicó Unido footballers
Championnat National 2 players
Championnat National 3 players
Segunda División B players
Primera B de Chile players
Chilean Primera División players
French expatriate footballers
French expatriate sportspeople in Spain
Expatriate footballers in Spain
French expatriate sportspeople in Chile
Expatriate footballers in Chile
Naturalized citizens of Chile
Citizens of Chile through descent